Sorrow Throughout the Nine Worlds is the debut EP by the Swedish melodic death metal band Amon Amarth, released in April 1996 by Pulverised Records. It was originally released as a digipak limited to 1500 copies and later re-pressed as a normal MCD in two different versions of 1500 and 1000 copies. The MCD was re-issued in 2000, digitally remastered in a press of 2000 copies. It was also released as a limited picture disc by Metal Supremacy Records with 500 copies in 2001. The entire album was eventually re-released in the "Viking edition" of Versus the World.

Track listing

Credits

Band members

 Olavi Mikkonen – guitar
 Johan Hegg – vocals
 Anders Hannson – guitar
 Ted Lundström – bass
 Niko Kaukinen – drums

Other
 Mixed and engineered by Peter Tägtgren
 Cover by Amon Amarth
 Layout by Honvie

1996 debut EPs
Amon Amarth albums